The 2018 Hungarian Fencing Championships were the 113th edition of the Hungarian Fencing Championships, which took place on 20–22 December 2018 at the Aladár Gerevich National Sports Hall in Budapest.

Schedule

Results

Men's

Women's

Medal table

Results

Men

Épée individual (men)

Épée team (men)

Foil individual (men)

Foil team (men)

Sabre individual (men)

Sabre team (men)

Women

Épée individual (women)

Épée team (women)

Foil individual (women)

Foil team (women)

Sabre individual (women)

Sabre team (women)

See also
Hungarian Fencing Championships
Hungarian Fencing Federation

References

External links
Official website of the Hungarian Fencing Federation

Hungarian Fencing Championships
Fencing Championships
Hungarian Fencing Championships